Diego Alonso Gómez (born 10 March 1972) is an Argentine actor, mostly known for his roles in telenovelas. He rose to fame for his starring role as Sergio "El Pollo" in the 2000 Canal 7 series Okupas.

Early life
Alonso Gómez was born in the Caballito neighbourhood of Buenos Aires on 10 March 1972 to a family of Cape Verdean and Tehuelche descent. One of his earliest non-actoral jobs was as a bouncer at the Pinar de Rocha nightclub in Ramos Mejía.

Career
Alonso Gómez's first roles were in the Canal 9 telenovelas La Nena and Por siempre mujercitas. He would later feature in minor roles in different productions at Telefe and El Trece. His breakthrough role would be as a co-star in the 2000 Canal 7 series Okupas, where he played the part of Sergio "El Pollo", part of a group of squatters at an abandoned house in Downtown Buenos Aires. Alonso has stated he had to quit his side-job at an ice cream store in order to fully dedicate himself to shooting Okupas. Okupas would go on to become an Argentine cult classic, and his performance as "El Pollo" earned him a Martín Fierro Award in 2001.

After his Okupas success, in 2002, he was part of the main cast of the América TV miniseries Tumberos, where he played the part of Jorge Artigas "Rada", and the El Trece series 099 Central. He continued to feature in secondary roles in various telenovelas and films, including Chronicle of an Escape and Agua (2006). From 2005 to 2006, he was a co-host of the El Trece investigative journalism show La liga, opposite Daniel Malnatti and María Julia Oliván. From 2007 to 2010, he hosted Cárceles, a docu-series run by Telefe showing the life of various people in prison. In 2008, he played a role in the Spanish-Argentine film Winter Visitor.

In 2016, he played the role of Fabián Suárez in the Martín Fierro-winning Telefe telenovela La Leona, and in 2017 he featured in the Televisión Pública series Cuéntame cómo pasó. He also had minor roles in the 2019 Telefe adaptation of To Catch a Thief, Atrapa a un ladrón, and the 2021 Amazon Prime biopic series Maradona: Blessed Dream.

Filmography

Film

Television

References

External links
  
 

1972 births
21st-century Argentine male actors
Actors from Buenos Aires
Afro-Argentine actors
Argentine male actors
Argentine male television actors
Argentine male stage actors
Argentine people of Cape Verdean descent
Argentine people of indigenous peoples descent
Living people